Mangelia callosa is a species of sea snail, a marine gastropod mollusk in the family Mangeliidae.

Description
The shell grows to a length of 5 mm.

Distribution
This species is found in the Aegean Sea off Turkey.

References

 Nordsieck, Fritz. The Turridae of the European seas. La Piramide, 1977.
 Gofas, S.; Le Renard, J.; Bouchet, P. (2001). Mollusca, in: Costello, M.J. et al. (Ed.) (2001). European register of marine species: a check-list of the marine species in Europe and a bibliography of guides to their identification. Collection Patrimoines Naturels, 50: pp. 180–213
 Mifsud C. & Ovalis P. (2003). A note on new discoveries and the distribution of a few Mollusca from the Eastern Mediterranean. La Conchiglia 306: 20–25

External links
 
  Tucker, J.K. 2004 Catalog of recent and fossil turrids (Mollusca: Gastropoda). Zootaxa 682:1–1295.

callosa
Gastropods described in 1977